Trudeau House, near Tunica in West Feliciana Parish, Louisiana, was built in about 1830.  It is a two-story brick and frame building with "hesitant touches of the Greek Revival style."  It was listed on the National Register of Historic Places in 1995.

It has been believed to be associated with Oliver Pollock, who was involved in financing the American Revolution, operating out of New Orleans, but that now seems unlikely.  Pollock owned the land before 1782 and after 1789.  The land with the house was sold in 1813 and Pollock lived in Mississippi from 1819 until his death in 1823, however, so dating of the house to c. 1830 rules out direct association.

References

Houses on the National Register of Historic Places in Louisiana
Greek Revival architecture in Louisiana
Houses completed in 1830
Buildings and structures in West Feliciana Parish, Louisiana